Seven Spirits may refer to:

The seven spirits of God referred to in the New Testament Book of Revelation
The Seven Spirits album performed by Eidolon (band)